Maurizio Piovani (born 17 July 1959) is an Italian former professional racing cyclist. He rode in the 1987 Tour de France.

References

External links

1959 births
Living people
Italian male cyclists
Cyclists from Cremona